John Barnett Hess (born April 5, 1954) is the current CEO of Hess Corporation.

Biography
John Hess was born in 1954 to a Jewish family, the son of Norma and Leon Hess. His father was the founder of the Hess Oil and Chemical Company which later became the Amerada Hess Corporation and is now known as the Hess Corporation. His maternal grandfather was the former attorney general David T. Wilentz, who prosecuted Bruno Richard Hauptmann in the Lindbergh baby kidnapping case. He has two sisters: Marlene Hess and former Pennsylvania State Senator, Constance H. Williams.

He earned his undergraduate degree from Harvard College in 1975 and his MBA from Harvard Business School in 1977. He married Susan Elizabeth Kessler in 1984. They live at 778 Park Avenue.

Hess became chairman and CEO of Hess Corporation in 1995. He stepped down as chairman in May 2013, retaining his position as CEO.

References

Living people
1954 births
People from Monmouth County, New Jersey
American people of Latvian-Jewish descent
American people of Lithuanian-Jewish descent
Harvard Business School alumni
Hess family
20th-century American businesspeople
Harvard College alumni